Ceroplesis nigromaculata is a species of beetle in the family Cerambycidae. It was described by Per Olof Christopher Aurivillius in 1910. It is known from Kenya, Uganda, and Tanzania.

References

nigromaculata
Beetles described in 1910